You Make Me Smile is an album by American flugelhornist Art Farmer's Quintet featuring saxophonist Clifford Jordan featuring performances recorded in 1984 and released on the Soul Note label.

Reception
The Allmusic review called the album "Creative bop-based music with Farmer's usual subtlety clearly in evidence".

Track listing
 "You Make Me Smile" (Rufus Reid) - 4:19   
 "Prelude No. 1" (Alexander Scriabin) - 7:02   
 "Nostalgia" (Tadd Dameron, Fats Navarro) - 5:42   
 "Flashback" (Art Farmer) - 7:51   
 "Souvenir" (Benny Carter) - 6:52   
 "Have You Met Miss Jones?" (Lorenz Hart, Richard Rodgers) - 4:48

Personnel
Art Farmer - flugelhorn
Clifford Jordan - tenor saxophone
Fred Hersch - piano
Rufus Reid - bass
Akira Tana - drums

References 

Black Saint/Soul Note albums
Art Farmer albums
1985 albums